The following television stations operate on virtual channel 39 in the United States:

 K14SC-D in Ashland, Oregon
 K14TF-D in Opelousas, Louisiana
 K23OW-D in Hot Springs, Arkansas
 K24NI-D in Yuma, Arizona
 K25QS-D in Cortez, Colorado
 K27OO-D in Ellensburg, Washington
 K32CC-D in Montgomery Ranch, etc., Oregon
 K34ND-D in Moses Lake, Washington
 K38MM-D in International Falls, Minnesota
 K39CH-D in Redwood Falls, Minnesota
 K39EO-D in Crescent City, California
 K39JC-D in Butte, Montana
 KABE-CD in Bakersfield, California
 KBLR in Paradise, Nevada
 KETF-CD in Laredo, Texas
 KFPX-TV in Newton, Iowa
 KFXO-CD in Bend, Oregon
 KGKC-LD in Lawrence, Kansas
 KHGS-LD in Glenwood Springs, Colorado
 KHIZ-LD in Los Angeles, California
 KIAH in Houston, Texas
 KJDN-LD in Logan, Utah
 KJNB-LD in Jonesboro, Arkansas
 KJNE-LD in Jonesboro, Arkansas
 KKJB in Boise, Idaho
 KMCT-TV in West Monroe, Louisiana
 KMMD-CD in Salinas, California
 KNSD in San Diego, California
 KQDK-CD in Denver, Colorado
 KRTN-LD in Albuquerque, New Mexico
 KTAZ in Phoenix, Arizona
 KWCZ-LD in Sunnyside-Grandview, Washington
 KXTX-TV in Dallas, Texas
 KZLL-LD in Joplin, Missouri
 W27DG-D in Millersburg, Ohio
 W27EL-D in Champaign, Illinois
 W30EE-D in Jacksonville, Florida
 W39CA-D in Fulton, Mississippi
 WBXH-CD in Baton Rouge, Louisiana
 WBYD-CD in Pittsburgh, Pennsylvania
 WCZU-LD in Bowling Green, Kentucky
 WDTB-LD in Hamburg, New York
 WEMT in Greeneville, Tennessee
 WETU-LD in Montgomery, Alabama
 WFWA in Fort Wayne, Indiana
 WGCT-CD in Columbus, Ohio
 WHTN in Murfreesboro, Tennessee
 WIVM-LD in Canton, Ohio
 WJKP-LD in Corning, New York
 WLVT-TV in Allentown, Pennsylvania
 WMJF-CD in Towson, Maryland
 WNBJ-LD in Jackson, Tennessee
 WNYN-LD in New York, New York
 WOCB-CD in Marion, Ohio
 WQIZ-LD in Ashland, Ohio
 WQRF-TV in Rockford, Illinois
 WSFL-TV in Miami, Florida
 WSNN-LD in Sarasota, Florida
 WUNJ-TV in Wilmington, North Carolina
 WXCB-CD in Delaware, Ohio
 WYHB-CD in Chattanooga, Tennessee
 WYNB-LD in Ellenville, New York

The following television stations, which are no longer licensed, formerly operated on virtual channel 39 in the United States:
 K31PF-D in Weed, California
 K34QA-D in Klamath Falls, Oregon
 K39IU-D in Springfield, Missouri
 K39JS-D in Salt Lake City, Utah
 W39CY-D in Myrtle Beach, South Carolina
 W39DE-D in Cayey, Puerto Rico
 WUDM-LD in Wolcott, Indiana

References

39 virtual